Robert Huber (10 November 1906 – 18 August 1942) was a German rower. He competed in the men's eight event at the 1928 Summer Olympics. He was killed in action during World War II.

References

External links
 

1906 births
1942 deaths
German male rowers
Olympic rowers of Germany
Rowers at the 1928 Summer Olympics
Sportspeople from Offenbach am Main
German military personnel killed in World War II
Missing in action of World War II
20th-century German people